USS Harcourt may refer to the following ships of the United States Navy:

 , a Civil War tugboat that served on the Union blockade
 , a Liberty ship launched 27 December 1942 and sold for scrap in 1962

United States Navy ship names